Johnsongrass mosaic virus (JGMV) is a plant pathogenic virus of the family Potyviridae.  It is a known pathogen of the major grain crop maize.

External links
Family Groups - The Baltimore Method

Viral plant pathogens and diseases
Potyviruses